Events in the year 1870 in Iceland.

Incumbents 

 Monarch: Christian IX
 Council President of Denmark: Christian Emil Krag-Juel-Vind-Frijs (until: 28 May); Ludvig Holstein-Holsteinborg onwards

Events 

 William Morris visits Iceland for the first time.

Births 

 26 September − Christian X of Denmark (Kristján 10), the only King of Iceland.

References 

 
1870s in Iceland
Years of the 19th century in Iceland
Iceland
Iceland